Niels Eje (born Copenhagen 1954) is a Danish composer and oboist.

Niels Eje was educated at the Carl Nielsen Academy of Music in Denmark 1974 to 1979. Thereafter he studied with Lothar Koch of the Berlin Philharmonic.

His career included a position as principal oboist in the Danish National Symphony Orchestra, (1979 to 1990) performances in Europe, USA and Japan as soloist and chamber musician.

Niels Eje has composed and arranged a large repertoire for different classical ensembles as well as music for concerts, theatre, TV and documentaries. He is the founder of Trio Rococo (harp, Berit Spaelling, oboe Niels Eje,  and cello, Inge Mulvad,) whose album 'Norwegian Wood' was released worldwide.

Niels Eje has participated on several recordings with various artists in a number of genres, including with Miles Davis on the album Aura, and with Niels-Henning Ørsted Pedersen, Berit Spaelling, Inge Mulvad in the  album In the Name of Music

In 1998 Niels Eje founded the interdisciplinary project Musica Humana Research together with Professor Lars Heslet, Copenhagen University Hospital. The research projects were aimed at creating a new specially designed music environment in hospitals and with scientific methods documenting the effect. The music and research documentation is published under the name MusiCure.

Grants & Awards
 Jacob Gade Grant
 Børge Schrøder and Herta Finnerups grant for special achievements in music
 The "Jante Knuser Cultural Award" 2001 for best entrepreneur activity in the field of "cultural business" idea in Denmark - given to Niels Eje by the Ministry of Economic and Business Affairs, Denmark.
 Gold Award for the Trio Rococo recording "Classical Mystery Tour/Norwegian Wood"
 2007 Blair Sadler Award

Selected list of works
 Faries and Tales dedicated to James Galway and Safri Duo
 Pip’s Theme, from Great Expectations by Charles Dickens for oboe, cello, harp and electronics
 Biddy, from Great Expectations, violin/flute and piano
 Miss HavishamHouse, violin, harp and electronics
 Estella, violin, cello, harp
 Fragile Light, oboe, cello, harp and electronics( Trio Rococo)
 Infinity, oboe, cello and harp (Trio Rococo)
 Asian Echoes, oboe, cello and harp (trio Rococo)
 Sakhalin Fantasy, flute, oboe, cello and piano
 The Power of The Harp, harp solo ( Berit Spaelling)
 Ablaze suite The Vikings Large ensemble and soprano
 Sakura suite Japanese folk songs for piano and wind quintet
 Octoman, wind octet
 Oboe in Orbit, oboe and electronics
 The Storyteller, large ensemble and electronics
 Great Expectations suite, after Dickens (Ablaze)
 More than 30 titles for the Musica Humana research project

Discography

With Trio Rococo
 1988: Sonata and Divertimenti: Wolfgang Amadeus Mozart arranged by Niels Eje
 1991: Crystal Bridge, Music by Chick Corea, Palle Mikkelborg, Thomas Clausen and Niels Eje
 1992: Trio Rococo plays Rococo Trios. Music by Johann Wilhelm Hertel and Carl Philipp Emanuel Bach, arranged by Niels Eje
 1992: Hexerie eller Blind Alarm (stage music) – Music by Niels Eje (cassette)
 1994: Classical Mystery Tour, Trio Rococo plays The Beatles Gefion Records GFO 20112
 1994: Sangen er et Eventyr (The song is a fairy-tale), Music by Frederik Magle – feat. Trio Rococo (arranged by Niels Eje), NHØP, and others
 1996: Friends Music by Brian Wilson, Paul Simon and Niels Eje. Gefion Records GFO 20120
 1998: In The Name Of Music, Trio Rococo and NHØP. Gefion Records 3672634848639
 2001: No Time At All – Michael Vesterskov (‘Bromzkij Garden’)
 2002: Den danske sang til hver en tid (Danish Songs), Tritonus Choir & Trio Rococo. Arranged by John Höybye and Niels Eje. Exlibris

Niels Eje
 1993: Pride of The Ocean (single) – Music by Niels Eje
 1997: Ablaze, Music by Niels Eje, Gefion Records GFO 2012

With Selandia Wind Ensemble
 1989: Wind Chamber Music I – Danish and French composers
 1990: Wind Chamber Music II – W.A. Mozart
 1992: Wind Chamber Music III – Bach & Villa-Lobos
 1999: Wind Chamber Music IV – Carl Nielsen

With Solisti Pro Musica
 1990: Sonatas & Arias – J. S. Bach
 2005: Klassisk Jul – Merete Hjortsø – (Niels Eje: oboe & arrangement.)

MusiCure
Music composed and produced by Niels Eje and Inge Mulvad Eje:
 2003: MusiCure 1. The Journey
 2003: MusiCure 2. Equator
 2004: MusiCure 3. Fairy Tales
 2004: MusiCure 4. Northern Light
 2005: MusiCure 5. Seasons
 2006: MusiCure 6. Waves
 2007: MusiCure 7. Horizons
 2008: MusiCure 8. Peace
 2009: MusiCure 9. Scandinavia
 2010: MusiCure 10. Dreams
 2011: MusiCure Nature Editions (2-CD set)
 2013: MusiCure Moonlight & Nature Meditation (2-CD set)

Other CD releases where Niels Eje appears (selected)
 1985: Aura: Columbia Records, COL 463351 2, Miles Davis. Danish Radio Big Band. Conductor and composer: Palle Mikkelborg.
 1990: Homage/Once Upon a Time – NHØP/Mikkelborg
 1993: Kærlighedens Triumf (stage music) – Arranged by Niels Eje (cassette)
 1995: The musical Atlantis – Peter Spies et al. (oboe solo on Morgen på Atlantis)
 1995: Du Kan Få Mig Til Alt – Lis Sørensen and Stig Kreutzfeldt (solo on ‘Vågen I Drømmeland’)
 1997: Michael Brydenfelt, Trompet – (Niels Eje soloist in J.S. Bach Brandenburg Concerto no. 2)
 1999: Imprints – by Jan Lippert
 2001: Misty Paradise – Hanne Boel
 2001: King of Nothing – Henrik Andersen
 2006: Vores Bedste – Danser med Drenge, and others

References

External links
 Niels Eje website
 MusiCure
 The Research
 Trio Rococo

1954 births
Living people
Musicians from Copenhagen
Danish composers
Male composers
Danish oboists
Male oboists